Mrs Peppercorn's Magical Reading Room is a 24-minute Fantasy/Magical short film directed by Mike Le Han. In November 2010 the official trailer was released and entered into the International Movie Trailer Festival and won Best Trailer for an Un-Produced Movie. In March 2011 the film premiered at Bafta in London, then in August of the same year was requested by Disney Animation Studios to screen at their Burbank facility in Los Angeles. Three days later the film won grand prize of Best Short Film at the prestigious HollyShorts International Film Festival. In December 2011 it won Best Short Fiction Film at the Olypmia International Film Festival in Greece.

The short film was created as a promo for Le Han's up and coming feature trilogy titled 'PEPPERCORN'.

Awards

References

External links
 
 

British short films
2011 films
2010s English-language films